Enemies of Women is a 1923 American silent romantic drama film directed by Alan Crosland and starring Lionel Barrymore, Alma Rubens, Gladys Hulette, Pedro de Cordoba, and Paul Panzer. The film was produced by William Randolph Hearst through his Cosmopolitan Productions. Pre-fame actresses Clara Bow and Margaret Dumont have uncredited bit roles.

The film is based on the novel of the same title by Vicente Blasco Ibáñez.

Plot
As described in a film magazine review, Alicia, an adventuress, has occasion to befriend a Russian prince with whom she flees to France. They are happily living together when the Prince sees her with her young son and, knowing nothing of his existence, mistakes him for a youthful lover and quits her. He and several friends form a club known as the "Enemies of Women and plan to have nothing more to do with them. However, circumstances finally  reunite Alicia and the prince and they find happiness together.

Cast

Preservation
A print of the film at the Library of Congress is believed to be incomplete, missing reels 3 and 9 of 11 total.

See also
List of partially lost films
Lionel Barrymore filmography

References

External links

Still with Lionel Barrymore choking Alma Rubens
Still with Gladys Hulette, Lionel Barrymore, and Pedro de Cordoba (Wayback Machine)
Still with Lionel Barrymore (bare chested on right) and adversary in dueling scene 
Mike Mashon (January 2, 2019), "Welcoming Two “New” Films to the Public Domain", Library of Congress. Copy of partially restored Enemies of Women'' ("work in progress").

1923 films
1923 romantic drama films
American romantic drama films
American silent feature films
American black-and-white films
Films based on Spanish novels
Films based on works by Vicente Blasco Ibáñez
Films directed by Alan Crosland
Goldwyn Pictures films
1920s American films
Silent romantic drama films
Silent American drama films